Cornstalk is an unincorporated community in Greenbrier County, West Virginia, United States.

The community was named after Cornstalk, a leader of the Shawnee nation.

References

Unincorporated communities in Greenbrier County, West Virginia
Unincorporated communities in West Virginia